The Republican Party is a centrist liberal party in Tunisia. It was formed on 9 April 2012 as a merger of the Progressive Democratic Party (PDP), Afek Tounes and the Tunisian Republican Party, several minor parties and independents. The party is led by Maya Jribi who was previously the secretary-general of the PDP. The party held 11 out of 217 seats and was the largest oppositional party in the National Constituent Assembly of Tunisia. The party withdrew from the Union for Tunisia coalition, though it is still part of the National Salvation Front.

After the founding congress, nine assemblymen elected for the PDP contested the leadership vote and temporarily suspended their party membership. Those 9 members became part of the Democratic Alliance Party.

After the 2019 parliamentary election the party had no seats.

References

2012 establishments in Tunisia
Political parties established in 2012
Liberal parties in Tunisia